Strážkovice is a municipality and village in České Budějovice District in the South Bohemian Region of the Czech Republic. It has about 500 inhabitants.

Administrative parts
Villages of Lomec and Řevňovice are administrative parts of Strážkovice.

References

Villages in České Budějovice District